My Right to Ravage Myself is a 2005 South Korean film  based on the 1996 novel by Kim Young-ha. It was controversial for its sex scenes and edgy theme of suicide. It was selected to appear in the 7th annual Pusan International Film Festival in 2003 and the 2004 Fribourg International Film Festival.

Plot
The film follows a young man who makes a living by helping people commit the perfect suicide. After one woman's suicide, her boyfriend investigates the incident and discovers the man who is helping others with their suicides.

References
 
 
 

2003 films
2000s Korean-language films
South Korean drama films
Films directed by Jeon Soo-il
2000s South Korean films